"Drink, Swear, Steal & Lie" is a debut song co-written and recorded by American country music artist Michael Peterson for his first album Michael Peterson. It was released in May 1997 as his debut single, and the first single and reached number 3 on the Billboard Hot Country Singles & Tracks chart in August 1997. The song was written by Peterson and Paula Carpenter.

Content
The song is about a man whose father counsels him to never drink, swear, steal or lie. Later in life he finds that he drinks from a woman’s loving cup, he swears to never give her up, steals all of her kisses underneath the moon, and lies close to her, thus breaking all his rules.

Critical reception
Larry Flick, of Billboard magazine reviewed the song favorably, saying that Peterson has a "full-throated delivery that exudes personality and vocal charm". He goes on to say that the "energy in the production complements Peterson's performance, and the whole package signals the birth of a new star".

Music video
The music video was directed by Tim Hamilton and was premiered in mid-1997.

Chart performance
"Drink, Swear, Steal & Lie" debuted at number 60 on the U.S. Billboard Hot Country Singles & Tracks for the week of May 17, 1997.

Year-end charts

References

1997 debut singles
1997 songs
Michael Peterson (singer) songs
Songs written by Michael Peterson (singer)
Song recordings produced by Josh Leo
Reprise Records singles